Tale of Cinema is the sixth film by critically acclaimed South Korean director Hong Sang-soo. It was entered into the 2005 Cannes Film Festival.

Plot
As the film begins, Sangwon, an aimless and indecisive college student on school holiday after final examinations, avoids walking together with his older brother by instead taking a side street, where he finds a former girlfriend, Yongsil, working at an optician's store. Unsure of his own emotional preparedness in rekindling the relationship, he decides to watch a play while waiting for her to complete her work shift, delaying the decision to meet her later in the evening. The final words of anguish in the play, uttered by a desperately ill child unable to be comforted by his mother, would later be echoed by Sangwon from the rooftop of his parents' apartment after his own failed act of despair. In the film's corollary chapter, Tongsu, a struggling, rootless, and inscrutable filmmaker who has become obsessed with a short film directed by his former classmate - and in particular, the devoted and obliging woman in the film - encounters the young actress in person and begins to ingratiate himself into her company, acting out his projected image of her by imitating gestures and revisiting locations from the film in an attempt to realize his own created image of her.

Cast
 Kim Sang-kyung as Kim Dong-soo
 Lee Ki-woo as Jeon Sang-won
 Uhm Ji-won as Choi Young-shil
 Lee Kyung-jin as Sang-won's mother

See also
List of Korean-language films

References

External links

2005 films
2005 drama films
Films directed by Hong Sang-soo
South Korean independent films
2000s Korean-language films
South Korean drama films
2000s South Korean films